Jeffrey Radley  (13 October 1935 – 22 July 1970) was a British archaeologist and poet.

Career

Radley was an archaeologist, particularly interested in Prehistoric archaeology. He was also a poet, having a collection of poems published posthumously titled Scarred Temple....

Death
Radley was killed on 22 July 1970 during excavations on the Anglian Tower in York. He had reportedly climbed down into the trench during a lunch break when it collapsed on top of him.  He had been directing the excavations commissioned by the Royal Commission on the Historical Monuments of England.

A plaque on the site, unveiled by Lord Salisbury, commemorates his death:
This plaque is erected to the memory of Jeffrey Radley M.A. F.S.A. who carried out the excavation of the tower and was tragically killed in a subsequent accident at the site on July 22nd 1970.

Notes
a. For a full list of Radley's archaeological publications on the ADS, see here.

References

Fellows of the Society of Antiquaries of London
1935 births
1970 deaths
British archaeologists
Accidental deaths in England
20th-century archaeologists
People of the Royal Commission on the Historical Monuments of England